Agaya Gangai waterfalls are located in Kolli Hills of the Eastern Ghats, in India. Panchanathi, a jungle stream, cascades down as the Agaya Gangai (English: Ganges of Sky), near Arapaleeswarar temple atop the Kolli Hills in Namakkal district, Tamil Nadu. It is a  waterfall of the river Aiyaru. It is located in a mountain valley. Agaya Gangai is also known as Peraruvi or Pei aruvi by the people of Kolli Hills because of its scary resemblance and heavy water flow. To reach the Agaya Gangai, one has to climb down 1196 steps. The stairs are steep. Climbing down takes only 10 minutes. Climbing up takes 20–25 minutes. There are lot of shelters built on the way to take rest. 

The caves of Korakka Siddhar and Kalaanginatha Siddhar are situated near the Agaya Gangai waterfalls in the nearby forest.

See also
Agaya Gangai dwarf gecko

References 

Waterfalls of Tamil Nadu
Eastern Ghats
Namakkal district